Graystokes Provincial Park is a provincial park located on the border between the regional districts of Central Okanagan and North Okanagan in south-central British Columbia. It was established on 18 April 2001 to protect a large area of the ecologically diverse Okanagan Highland east of the Okanagan Valley.

Description
Graystokes Park is set in the Okanagan Highland, a plateau featuring a rich collection of alpine wetlands, meadows, and riparian habitats set within the larger Okanagan dry forests ecoregion. The highland provinces critical mid-to-late summer habitat for local wildlife when the valley floor is no longer productive.

The park is underdeveloped with no dedicated trails or running water. Motorized vehicles are forbidden from entering the park, with the exception of snowmobiles during winter months. Hunting is a popular activity during open season. Despite its backcountry nature, the park is rated as a Category II protected area by the IUCN.

Ecology
Greystokes Provincial Park protects an extensive old growth forest dominated by subalpine fir, Engelmann spruce, and Douglas fir. Large mammals found within the park include grizzly bear, mountain caribou, moose, mule deer, and white-tailed deer.

See also
Granby Provincial Park

References

External links
 Graystokes Protected Area

Monashee Mountains
Provincial parks of British Columbia
2001 establishments in British Columbia
Protected areas established in 2001